Aloysius Leitner (1893 – June 12, 1918) served in the United States Marine Corps during World War I. He was posthumously awarded the Navy Cross and Distinguished Service Cross.

His Navy Cross citation reads:

His Distinguished Service Cross citation reads:

Leitner was born in Charlesburg, Wisconsin. His home of record was New Holstein, Wisconsin.

References

People from New Holstein, Wisconsin
Recipients of the Navy Cross (United States)
Recipients of the Distinguished Service Cross (United States)
United States Marines
United States Marine Corps personnel of World War I
Military personnel from Wisconsin
1918 deaths
1893 births
People from Brothertown, Wisconsin
American military personnel killed in World War I